Steve Heller is an American author.  His novel The Automotive History of Lucky Kellerman was a selection of the Book-of-the-Month Club. His writings have earned a National Endowment for the Arts Fellowship and two O. Henry Awards.  He is the Chair, Master of Fine Arts in Creative Writing Program at Antioch University Los Angeles.

Heller grew up near Yukon, Oklahoma.  He has a B.A. in English, M.S. in English Education from Oklahoma State University, and M.F.A. in creative writing from Bowling Green State University.  Heller began teaching as an English instructor at Ponca City High School.  In 1990 he received the Kansas Literary Artists Fellowship in Fiction, and in 1996 the Kansas Governor's Arts Award.

Works
The Man Who Drank A Thousand Beers, a collection, Chariton Review Press, 1984 
The Automotive History of Lucky Kellerman, Chelsea Green, 1987 
Father's Mechanical Universe, BkMk Press, 2001 
Walking Through the Moon: A Family Memoir, (in progress)

Reviews
Although criticizing the ending, The New York Times called Lucky Kellerman a "quiet and often beautiful book".  The Los Angeles Times described it as "mesmerizing but relentlessly grim".

References

External links
Contributor to Oklahoma Review
His page at Antioch
Entry at Kansas State Library

20th-century American novelists
21st-century American novelists
American male novelists
Oklahoma State University alumni
Bowling Green State University alumni
Year of birth missing (living people)
Living people
People from Yukon, Oklahoma
20th-century American male writers
21st-century American male writers
Place of birth missing (living people)